The Russian Synodal Bible (The Synodal Translation) is a Russian non-Church Slavonic translation of the Bible commonly used by the Russian Orthodox Church, Roman Catholic,  as well as Russian Baptists and other Protestant communities in Russia.
The translation dates to the period 1813–1875, and the first complete edition was published in 1876.
The first edition in modernized orthography appeared in 1956. The first digital edition was prepared by the Moscow Patriarchate in 2000.

History
The translation began in 1813, after the establishment of the Russian Bible Society and by permission of Czar Alexander I. The complete New Testament was published in 1820 and the Old Testament was already translated up to the book of Ruth when work on the project was halted in 1825(?). In that year the Russian Bible Society was disbanded and its translation work discontinued under a more conservative emperor Nicholas I (between 1825 and 1855) due to its suspected seditious influence on the Russian population. It was again resumed and completed in the next reign, of Alexander II.

The Most Holy Synod entrusted the completion of the translation to four Orthodox theological academies, in Moscow, Saint Petersburg, Kazan and Kiev. The complete Bible was published in 1876 and included the 1820s translation of the New Testament with very few changes, as well as the Old Testament, whose translation reflected the work done both before and after the period of reaction. The final editorship was performed by Filaret, Metropolitan of Moscow. 

The translation of the Old Testament is based on the Jewish Masoretic Text, while that of the New Testament is based on the Greek printed editions of that time. This decision was grounded on Filaret's 1834 note "On the need of the Russian Church for a translation of the whole Bible from the original texts to the modern Russian language" and reflected the growing acceptance in the Russian theological community of the contemporary Western standards of Biblical scholarship of the time. 

Official permission to use the Masoretic Text as preserved by the Jews (rather than relying on the Septuagint and/or the Church Slavonic translations as preserved by the Christians) was granted to Filaret by the Synod in 1862, even though technically the translation was already mostly completed by that time. 

In the 1870s, when the complete Russian Bible was being finalized, the linguistic norms of the Russian language had already changed when compared to those of the early 19th century, when most of the translation work was completed. Nevertheless, the translations that were done earlier remained largely unchanged, due mostly to the considerably smaller scale of the entire translation project compared to what was done by the Russian Bible Society before it was closed in the 1820s. 

The translation retains a strong reliance on the vocabulary and style of the Church Slavonic translation (9th century, first printed 1564).
The Synodal version remains a linguistic phenomenon of its own kind that left an imprint on both modern spoken Russian and literary Russian by introducing certain distinctive features of Church Slavonic.

A new edition of the 1876 translation was published in 1917, just before the Russian revolution.
The Moscow Patriarchate under Alexy I published the first edition in post-1917 orthography in 1956.
Beyond the orthographic changes, there were minimal corrections and some changes bring the text closer to modern standard Russian. 
A new edition of 1968 included two maps and again had some modernisations of spelling and punctuation.  
An edition published 1988 was almost identical to the 1968 one, with the correction a few typographical errors and the inclusion of three new maps. While the 1968 was almost exclusively for the internal use by the Russian Orthodox Church, the 1988 was sold publicly, and scans of this edition were uploaded to the early internet.
The first edition in digital typeset appeared in 2000, again with some normalization in spelling, punctuation and grammar. This edition had very limited circulation in printed form but was published digitally on the website of the Moscow Patriarchate. 
A new edition published in 2008 again adapted some spellings (such as святого for святаго, шестой for шестый). The maps are the same as in the 1988 edition, but reproduced in better quality. The 2008 edition was reprinted in 2012, with the correction of a few misprints.

Text samples

See also
Russian Bible Society
Bible translations into Russian

References

External links
Official Publisher
 eBook for iPad / iPhone / Mac
 eBook for Android / Google
 E-text at archive.org
 HTML version at patriarchia.ru
 Textological Basis of the Synodal Translation (the Old Testament) by Andrey Desnitskiy

1876 non-fiction books
Russian Orthodox Church in Russia
Russian books
Bible translations into Russian
History of the Russian Orthodox Church